Waldemar Josef (born 25 October 1960) is a retired German footballer. He spent three seasons with Eintracht Braunschweig in the Bundesliga, as well as one season in the 2. Bundesliga.

References

External links

1960 births
Living people
People from Wolfsburg
Footballers from Lower Saxony
German footballers
Eintracht Braunschweig players
VfL Wolfsburg players
Association football goalkeepers
Bundesliga players
2. Bundesliga players